The following are the regional Lepidoptera lists by continent. Lepidoptera is the insect order consisting of both the butterflies and moths.

Lepidoptera are among the most successful groups of insects. They are found on all continents, except Antarctica. Lepidoptera inhabit all terrestrial habitats ranging from desert to rainforest, from lowland grasslands to montane plateaus but almost always associated with higher plants, especially angiosperms (flowering plants). Among the most northern dwelling species of butterflies and moths is the Arctic Apollo (Parnassius arcticus), which is found in the Arctic Circle in northeastern Yakutia, at an altitude of 1500 meters above sea level. In the Himalayas, various Apollo species such as Parnassius epaphus, have been recorded to occur up to an altitude of 6,000 meters above sea level.

Some lepidopteran species exhibit symbiotic, phoretic, or parasitic life-styles, inhabiting the bodies of organisms rather than the environment. Coprophagous pyralid moth species, called sloth moths, such as Bradipodicola hahneli and Cryptoses choloepi, are unusual in that they are exclusively found inhabiting the fur of sloths, mammals found in Central and South America.
Two species of Tinea moths have been recorded as feeding on horny tissue and have been bred from the horns of cattle. The larva of Zenodochium coccivorella is an internal parasite of the coccid Kermes species. Many species have been recorded as breeding in natural materials or refuse such as owl pellets, bat caves, honey-combs or diseased fruit.

Of the approximately 174,250 lepidopteran species described until 2007, butterflies and skippers are estimated to comprise approximately 17,950, with moths making up the rest. The vast majority of Lepidoptera are to be found in the tropics, but substantial diversity exists on most continents. North America has over 700 species of butterflies and over 11,000 species of moths, while there are about 400 species of butterflies and 14,000 species of moths reported from Australia. The diversity of Lepidoptera in each faunal region has been estimated by John Heppner in 1991 based partly on actual counts from the literature, partly on the card indices in the Natural History Museum (London) and the National Museum of Natural History (Washington), and partly on estimates:

Species by continent

Africa

Asia

Europe

North America

South America

Oceania

Antarctica
No Lepidoptera species are known from the continent of Antarctica. However, there are records from nearby islands.

References

See also
For other Lepidoptera lists, see the categories:

 List
 
 
Lists by region